The 2013 Los Angeles election was held on March 5, 2013 in the city of Los Angeles, California. Voters elected candidates in a nonpartisan primary, with runoff elections scheduled for May 21, 2013. The executive offices of Mayor, City Attorney, and City Controller, as well as eight seats of the City Council, were up for election.

Municipal elections in California are officially nonpartisan; candidates' party affiliations do not appear on the ballot.

Mayor

City Attorney

City Controller

City Council

District 1

District 3

District 5

District 7

District 9

District 11

District 13

District 15

References

External links 
 Office of the City Clerk, City of Los Angeles

Los Angeles
2013
Los Angeles